Lamprotettix is a genus of true bugs belonging to the family Cicadellidae.

Species:
 Lamprotettix yunnanensis Dai, Shen & Zhang, 2003

References

Cicadellidae
Hemiptera genera